Xavier Dolan-Tadros  (born 20 March 1989) is a Canadian filmmaker, actor and costume designer. He began his career as a child actor in commercials before directing several arthouse feature films. He first received international acclaim in 2009 for his feature film directorial debut, I Killed My Mother, which he also starred in, wrote, and produced, and which premiered at the 62nd Cannes Film Festival in the Directors' Fortnight section and won three awards from the program.

Since 2009, he has written and directed eight feature films, all of which have premiered at Cannes, with the exception of Tom at the Farm—which premiered at the 70th Venice International Film Festival in 2013—and his first English-language film, The Death & Life of John F. Donovan, which premiered at the 2018 Toronto International Film Festival. Dolan has also directed music videos, notably with Adele for the videos of her singles "Hello" (2015), and "Easy on Me" (2021), for which he received a Grammy Award for Best Music Video nomination.

Dolan has won many accolades for his work, including the Jury Prize at the 2014 Cannes Film Festival for Mommy and the Grand Prix at the 2016 Cannes Film Festival for It's Only the End of the World. He has also won several Canadian Screen Awards and César Awards.

Outside of his own films, Dolan has also starred in films from other directors, including Elephant Song (2014), Boy Erased (2018), Bad Times at the El Royale (2018), and It Chapter Two (2019).

Early life 
Dolan was born and raised in Montreal, Quebec. He is the son of Geneviève Dolan, a Quebecois teacher, and Manuel Tadros, a successful Egyptian-Canadian actor and singer of Coptic and Lebanese descent.

Career

Early films 
Dolan attracted international attention with his directorial debut, I Killed My Mother, which he wrote, directed, produced and starred in at the age of 19, using funds from his extensive work as a child actor. He reportedly began writing the script when he was 16 years old. He said in an interview with Canadian newspaper  that the film was partly autobiographical.

The film was at first financed solely by Dolan, but when need for more money arose, he asked Telefilm and the SODEC for subsidies. Each turned him down for different reasons. SODEC, who had loved the project but refused to finance it because it was submitted to a too commercial department, encouraged Dolan to submit it again in more appropriate "indie" department, which he did. In December 2008, SODEC gave him a $400,000 subsidy. In all, the film cost around $800,000 CAD. Dolan said that the system to acquire funding is "an obsolete financing mechanism that holds the creative assets of Quebec hostage".

The film premiered at the Director's Fortnight program of the 2009 Cannes Film Festival where it received an eight-minute standing ovation and won three awards: the Art Cinema Award, the SACD Prize for screenplay, and the Prix Regards Jeunes. It also won a Lumière Award and four Jutra Awards, including Best Film, Best Screenplay, and Most Successful Film Outside Québec, beating out Denis Villeneuve's film  (2009) in what was deemed an "upset".

Dolan later said that the film was "flawed" and Peter Brunette of The Hollywood Reporter called it "a somewhat uneven film that demonstrates a great deal of talent". Brunette also called the film "funny and audacious", while Allan Hunter of Screen International said that it possessed "the sting of shrewdly observed truth".

The film received the Claude Jutra Award (now known as the Canadian Screen Award for Best First Feature) at the Genies, and the Toronto Film Critics Association awarded Dolan the inaugural $5,000 Jay Scott Prize for emerging talent. I Killed My Mother was named one of Canada's Top Ten features of the year by the Toronto International Film Festival (TIFF) and chosen as Canada's official entry for Best Foreign Language Film for the 2010 Academy Awards, though it failed to receive a nomination from the academy. Distribution rights were later sold to more than 20 countries. Due to legal problems experienced by the film's U.S. distributor, Regent Entertainment, it was not released theatrically in the U.S. until 2013, and once released, it earned little at the box office.

The second feature film Dolan directed, Heartbeats, was financed privately. The film follows two friends who are infatuated with the same mysterious young man and their friendship suffers. It premiered in the Un Certain Regard category at the 63e Festival de Cannes in May 2010 where it received a standing ovation. It won the top prize of the Official Competition at the Sydney Film Festival in June and screened at several film festivals throughout 2011, but failed to find audiences in non-French-speaking countries. It received several Genie nominations and the AQCC (Québec association of film critics) award for Best Film.

His third film, Laurence Anyways, was selected to compete in the  section at the 2012 Cannes Film Festival. Suzanne Clément's performance in the film won the section's award for Best Actress. The film received praise or qualified praise from critics. A critic for MTV's The Out Take, which focuses on LGBT films, called the film "the best film of the year." Despite the praise, the film was not released commercially for a year. Upon release, the film struggled at the box office, and only grossed roughly $500,000 in Canada.

In May 2012, Dolan announced that his fourth film would be an adaptation of Michel Marc Bouchard's play Tom at the Farm (Tom à la ferme). It received its world premiere in the main competition section at the 70th Venice International Film Festival on 2 September 2013 and won the FIPRESCI award. Though Tom at the Farm played the festival circuits in 2013, it was not released in the U.S. until 2015. In an August 2015 interview, Dolan said: "No one knows me in the States, because the movies have been released in such an awkward, irregular fashion, all by different distributors... I don't want to sound pretentious, but it's puzzling."

Mommy 

Dolan's 2014 film, Mommy, shared the Jury Prize in the main competition section at the 2014 Cannes Film Festival with Jean-Luc Godard's film Goodbye to Language. The jury president for the 2014 festival was Jane Campion and, upon receiving the award, Dolan stated: The Piano [Campion's film] was the first film that I watched that truly defined who I am... It made me want to write films for beautiful women with soul and will and strength. To even stand on the same stage as you [Campion] is extraordinary.The film was singled out by critics as Dolan's "most mature" film to date and proved to be a breakthrough in his career as a director. It was his first film to achieve significant success at the box office, grossing over $3.5 million domestically in 2014, becoming the highest-selling film in Quebec for 2014. According to the Montreal Gazette, over one million people saw the film in France. Mommy won the César Award for Best Foreign Film in 2015.

It's Only the End of the World 

Filming commenced in late May 2015. The film was an official selection for the 2016 Cannes Film Festival, in competition for the Palme d'Or, though it did not win.

The film premiered to polarized reactions from festival audiences and critics, with Vanity Fair calling it "the most disappointing film at Cannes." The Hollywood Reporter called it "a cold and deeply unsatisfying" film and Variety dubbed it "a frequently excruciating dramatic experience". During the festival, Dolan spoke out against the negative criticism in the media. The film also received positive reviews from critics, including The Guardian, which called it a "brilliant, stylised and hallucinatory evocation of family dysfunction".

Dolan stated that It's Only the End of the World is his best film and the one he's the most proud of. The film was nomiated for several awards and won a few awards such as the Grand Prix and the Ecumenical Jury Prize.

For his work on It's Only the End of the World, Dolan won the César Awards for Best Director and Best Editing at the 42nd ceremony on 24 February 2017. He also won 3 Canadian Screen Awards for Best Motion Picture, Best Achievement in Direction and Best Adapted Screenplay.

The Death & Life of John F. Donovan 

In March 2013, Dolan was in pre-production for his first English-language film The Death & Life of John F. Donovan; he co-wrote the screenplay with Jacob Tierney. The film follows John F. Donovan (Kit Harington), a Hollywood film actor whose life and career are turned upside-down when a gossip columnist (Jessica Chastain) exposes his private correspondence with an 11-year-old British fan. The film also stars Susan Sarandon as Donovan's mother and Kathy Bates as his manager. In February 2018, Dolan confirmed via Instagram that Chastain had been cut from the film, and that the story had been altered throughout post-production.

The film had its world premiere at the 2018 Toronto International Film Festival, making it Dolan's first film to premiere at the festival. Following its premiere at the festival, it received universally negative reviews from critics. IndieWire dubbed the film Dolan's "worst" of his career. The Guardian gave the film one out of five stars, deeming it a "dubious mess". Now magazine called the film "mediocre at best". In a more positive review, Screen International wrote that the film "may revisit a lot of familiar territory for Dolan but on this form it is good to welcome him home."

Dolan's eighth film was titled . It centres on the titular Matthias (played by Gabriel D'Almeida Freitas) and Maxime (played by Xavier Dolan), lifelong friends whose relationship is tested when they act in a short film whose script calls for them to kiss each other, leaving them both questioning their sexual identities when the experience awakens their long-dormant feelings for each other.

The film had its world premiere at the Cannes Film Festival on 22 May 2019. The film was nominated for seven awards at the 22nd Quebec Cinema Awards, including Best Supporting Actor for Funk and Best Editing for Dolan. It won for Best Supporting Actress for Bernard, Best Music for Jean-Michel Blais, and Most Successful Film Outside Quebec.

Other work 
In 2015, Dolan was selected to serve on the jury for the main competition section of the 2015 Cannes Film Festival. Also that year, he directed the music video for "Hello", the lead single from the album 25 by Adele. The video broke the Vevo record for most views in 24 hours, over 27.7 million views. The video was also notable for featuring footage shot in IMAX. Dolan received the Juno Award for Video of the Year for directing the video.

Dolan played supporting roles in two 2018 American films: Boy Erased, opposite Lucas Hedges and Troye Sivan, which premiered at the 2018 Toronto International Film Festival; and Bad Times at the El Royale, as a British-accented music producer, Buddy Sunday. He appeared in the horror follow-up It Chapter Two, which was released in September 2019.

In December 2021, Dolan confirmed via Instagram the end of the shooting of his first TV Drama, The Night Logan Woke Up, based on Michel Marc Bouchard's play of the same name.

Dolan co-owns along with producer Nancy Grant, the production company Sons of Manual.

Influences and style 

Dolan has said that he is not particularly influenced by any specific directors, though in 2009, Dolan identified Michael Haneke as one of his favourite directors for his precise camerawork and strong writing, citing Haneke's Funny Games and The Piano Teacher as favourites.

At the 2014 Cannes Film Festival, Dolan said that The Piano by Jane Campion was a major inspiration for him. He has also cited seeing the film Titanic as an early influence on his decision to enter the film industry. He has mentioned paying tribute to My Own Private Idaho with a sequence in I Killed My Mother, and that he was influenced by the frog rain scene at the end of Magnolia, but said in 2013:What I'm trying to say is that I'm not that influenced by directors.... I've read basically every review of my films because I'm crazy and I focus on what's negative and I want to know what people think—and why they think it. So many times I've been bullied into references and influences that were never mine by viewers that would project their opinions and associations and assumptions on me.... But let's get real: ideas travel and everything's been done, it's all a matter of interpreting things again now.

Personal life 
Dolan is openly gay, and described his first film, I Killed My Mother, as semi-autobiographical.

Filmography

Film

As filmmaker

Acting roles

As voice actor 
Dolan is also a voice actor and has dubbed several films in Quebec French.
Note: Many films that are dubbed in French are also dubbed in the French spoken in Québec or in one of the versions of French known as international French. DVDs may be labelled VQ for "version Québécoise", which uses a Québécois accent and terms unique to that variety of the French language, or VFQ for "version francophone québécoise", which presents a generally neutral accent but pronounces English words in a way found in North America rather than in France.
 2000: My Dog Skip – Spit
 2000: Pay it Forward – Trevor
 2001: Harry Potter and the Sorcerer's Stone – Ron Weasley
 2002: Harry Potter and the Chamber of Secrets – Ron Weasley
 2002: The Hunchback of Notre Dame II – Zephyr
 2003: Secondhand Lions – Walter
 2003: The Jungle Book 2 – Mowgli
 2003: Finding Nemo – Tad
 2004: Harry Potter and the Prisoner of Azkaban – Ron Weasley
 2005: Saw II – Daniel Matthews
 2005: Harry Potter and the Goblet of Fire – Ron Weasley
 2006: Grossology – Ty
 2006: Alpha Dog – Keith Stratten
 2007: Harry Potter and the Order of the Phoenix – Ron Weasley
 2007: Halloween – Wesley Rhoades
 2007: Magi-Nation – Tony
 2007: Whistler – Quinn McKaye
 2008: High School Musical 3: Senior Year – Donnie Dion
 2008: Twilight – Jacob Black
 2009: Harry Potter and the Half-Blood Prince – Ron Weasley
 2009: The Twilight Saga: New Moon – Jacob Black
 2009: South Park – Stan Marsh
 2009: Planet 51 – Skiff
 2010: Kick-Ass – Dave Lizewski / Kick-Ass
 2010: How To Train Your Dragon – Hiccup
 2010: The Twilight Saga: Eclipse – Jacob Black
 2010: Harry Potter and the Deathly Hallows – Part 1 – Ron Weasley
 2011: Harry Potter and the Deathly Hallows – Part 2 – Ron Weasley
 2011: My Week with Marilyn – Colin Clark
 2011: Abduction – Nathan Harper
 2011: The Twilight Saga: Breaking Dawn – Part 1 – Jacob Black
 2011: The Smurfs – Brainy Smurf
 2012: John Carter – Edgar Rice Burroughs
 2012: The Hunger Games – Peeta Mellark
 2012: Life of Pi – Pi Patel
 2012: Chernobyl Diaries – Chris
 2013: Kick-Ass 2 – Dave Lizewski / Kick-Ass
 2014: Maleficent – Prince Philip
 2014: The Maze Runner – Thomas
 2014: The Theory of Everything – Stephen Hawking
 2014: The Amazing Spider-Man 2 – Harry Osborn
 2015: Inside Out – Fear
 2015: Paper Towns – Quentin "Q" Jacobsen
 2015: Maze Runner: The Scorch Trials – Thomas
 2015: The Danish Girl – Einar Wegener / Lili Elbe (Lili Elvenes)
 2016: Everybody Wants Some!! – Jake
 2016: Fantastic Beasts and Where to Find Them – Newt Scamander
 2017: The Emoji Movie - Gene
 2018: Maze Runner: The Death Cure - Thomas
 2018: Anatane: Saving the Children of Okura - Anatane
 2018: Fantastic Beasts: The Crimes of Grindelwald – Newt Scamander
 2019: Spider-Man: Far From Home - Brad Davis
 2019: The Death & Life of John F. Donovan - John F. Donovan
 2021: Dune: Part One - Paul Atreides
 2022: Fantastic Beasts: The Secrets of Dumbledore – Newt Scamander

As music video director

Frequent collaborators

Accolades

Books on Xavier Dolan

See also 
List of Canadian actors
List of Canadian directors
List of Canadian producers

References

Further reading 
 Pierre-Alexandre Fradet, "Xavier Dolan", Séquences, No. 279, July–August 2012, pp. 46–47, interview at Cannes.
 Dominique Hétu, "Reconnaissance de soi et revendication de l'autre: éthique du care et identité trans dans Laurence Anyways et Le sexe des étoiles" , in Sylvano Santini et Pierre-Alexandre Fradet (eds.), issue "Cinéma et philosophie", Nouvelles Vues (winter-spring 2016)

External links 

 

1989 births
Best Director César Award winners
Canadian male television actors
Canadian male film actors
Canadian male child actors
Film directors from Montreal
Canadian screenwriters in French
Canadian male voice actors
French-language film directors
Canadian gay actors
Knights of the National Order of Quebec
LGBT film directors
Canadian LGBT screenwriters
Living people
Male actors from Montreal
Members of the Order of Canada
Canadian people of Coptic descent
Canadian people of Lebanese descent
Canadian people of Egyptian descent
Canadian gay writers
20th-century Canadian male actors
21st-century Canadian male actors
Best First Feature Genie and Canadian Screen Award winners
French Quebecers
Writers from Montreal
Film producers from Quebec
LGBT film producers
Best Director Genie and Canadian Screen Award winners
Best Editing Genie and Canadian Screen Award winners
Best Screenplay Genie and Canadian Screen Award winners
Best Costume Design Genie and Canadian Screen Award winners
Canadian music video directors
Juno Award for Video of the Year winners
Best Director Jutra and Iris Award winners
Gay screenwriters
21st-century Canadian LGBT people
20th-century Canadian LGBT people